Wynn Andrew Roberts  (born March 1, 1988) is an American biathlete. He competed in the 20 km individual race at the 2010 Olympics and finished 86th out of 88 with a final time of 58:49.2. He was a late replacement for Jeremy Teela, who withdrew due to illness on the morning of the event.

References

External links

IBU profile
NBCOlympics.com profile

1988 births
American male biathletes
Biathletes at the 2010 Winter Olympics
Living people
Olympic biathletes of the United States
21st-century American people